The Southland Regional Council (branded as Environment Southland) is the southernmost regional council in New Zealand, administering the Southland Region, including Stewart Island. In 2006, it had an operating revenue of NZ$19.6 million, NZ$7.1 million of this from rates revenue.

Councillors

References 

Politics of Southland, New Zealand
Regional councils of New Zealand